This is a list of topics related to the United Arab Emirates. Those interested in the subject can monitor changes to the pages by clicking on Related changes in the sidebar.

Buildings and structures
 Al Dhafra Air Base
 BurJuman
 Grand Mosque
 Gulf Research Centre
 House of Poetry
 Jumeirah Islands
 List of shopping malls in the United Arab Emirates
 Qasr al-Hosn
 The Marina Torch
 List of universities in the United Arab Emirates

Airports
 Abu Dhabi International Airport
 Al Ain International Airport
 Dubai International Airport
 Dubai World Central International Airport
 Sharjah International Airport
 Ras Al Khaimah International Airport

Amusement parks
 Dubailand
 Falconcity of Wonders

Archaeological sites
 Abu Dhabi Islands Archaeological Survey
 Khor Fakkan
 Marawah
 Mileiha
 Sir Bani Yas

Bridges
 Al Garhoud Bridge
 Al Maktoum Bridge
 Al Maqta'a Bridge
 Al Shindagha Tunnel
 Floating Bridge

Buildings and structures in Dubai
 Al Barsha Third
 American University in Dubai
 Dubai Healthcare City
 Dubai International Airport
 Dubai International Convention Centre
 Dubai Internet City
 Dubai Knowledge Village
 Dubai Mall
 Dubai Marina
 Dubai Media City
 Dubai Pearl
 Mall of the Emirates
 Palm Islands
 Ski Dubai
 University of Wollongong in Dubai
 Middlesex University Dubai
 Wild Wadi Water Park

Projects by Al Nakheel
 Dubai Waterfront
 Ibn Battuta Mall
 Jumeirah Bay
 Jumeirah Islands
 Lake Shore Towers
 Palm Islands
 Palm Jumeirah
 The World (archipelago)

Proposed buildings and structures in Dubai

 Al Burj
 Almas Tower
 Armada Towers
 Bawadi
 Burj Al Alam
 Dubai Land
 Dubai Waterfront
 Dubai World Central
 Dubai World Central International Airport
 Emirates Hotel
 Falconcity of Wonders
 Jumeirah Bay
 Jumeirah Lake Towers
 Lake Shore Towers
 Mag 218 Tower
 Mall of Arabia (Dubai)
 One Business Bay
 Rose Rotana Suites
 The World (archipelago)
 Wind Towers

Skyscrapers in Dubai
 Burj Khalifa
 21st Century Tower
 23 Marina
 Ahmed Abdul Rahim Al Attar Tower
 Almas Tower
 Burj Dubai Lake Hotel & Serviced Apartments
 Burj al-Arab
 Chelsea Tower
 Dubai World Trade Centre
 Emirates Office Tower
 Emirates Towers
 Infinity Tower
 Jumeirah Emirates Towers Hotel
 Mag 218 Tower
 Rose Rotana Suites
 The Tower (Dubai)

Hospitals
 List of hospitals in the United Arab Emirates
 Dr. Sulaiman Al-Habib Medical Center
 New Medical Center

Hotels
 Burj al-Arab
 Emirates Palace
 Grand Hyatt Dubai
 Jumeirah Emirates Towers Hotel
 Jumeirah International Group
 Rose Rotana Suites
 Shangri-La Hotel, Dubai
 InterContinental Hotels Group Dubai Festival City

Shopping malls
 Abu Dhabi Mall
 BurJuman
 The Dubai Mall
 Ibn Battuta Mall
 List of shopping malls in the United Arab Emirates
 Mall of Arabia (Dubai)
 Mall of the Emirates
 Marina Mall, Abu Dhabi
 Wafi
 Deira City Centre
 Mirdif City Centre

Skyscrapers
 Silver Tower (Abu Dhabi)
 Sky Tower Dubai

Sports venues
 Sheikh Zayed Stadium

Cricket grounds
 Sharjah Cricket Association Stadium
 Sheikh Zayed Cricket Stadium

Football venues
 Al Emirate Club Stadium
 Al Jazira Mohammed Bin Zayed Stadium
 Jeque Zayed Stadium
 Khalid Bin Mohammed Stadium
 Al-Maktoum Stadium
 Al-Nahyan Stadium
 Al-Rashid Stadium
 Sharjah Stadium (football)
 Sheikh Khalifa International Stadium
 Tahnoun Bin Mohamed Stadium

Rugby union stadiums in Dubai
 Dubai Exiles Rugby Ground

Cities
 List of cities in the United Arab Emirates
 Abu Dhabi
 Dubai
 Sharjah
 Ajmān (city)
 Fujairah
 Umm al-Quwain
 Ras al-Khaimah

Dubai
 Dubai
 7DAYS
 Al Garhoud bridge
 Al Karama, Dubai
 Business Bay
 Crystal Tower
 Dubai Airshow
 Dubai American Academy
 Dubai Desert Classic
 Dubai Drydocks
 Dubai Festival City
 Dubai Healthcare City
 Dubai International Financial Center
 Dubai International Food Safety Conference
 Dubai International Holy Quran Award
 Dubai Internet City
 Dubai Investment Group
 Dubai Mall
 Dubai Media Incorporated
 Dubai Police Force
 Dubai Ports World
 Dubai Shopping Festival
 Dubai Silicon Oasis
 Dubai Summer Surprises
 Dubai Science Park
 Family tree of the Al Maktoum rulers
 Gulf News
 Gulf Research Center
 Jebel Ali Free Zone
 Jumeirah
 Jumeirah International Group
 Khaleej Times
 List of fish on stamps of Dubai
 List of rulers of separate Emirates of the United Arab Emirates
 List of shopping malls in the United Arab Emirates
 List of shopping malls in Dubai
 Mushrif Park
 My Vision - Challenges in the Race for Excellence
 Qasim Sultan al-Banna
 Satwa, Dubai
 Suna pur
 Tourism in Dubai

Universities and colleges in Dubai
 Birla Institute of Technology and Science

Communications
 Communications in the United Arab Emirates
 .ae
 Du (telco)
 Etisalat
 Postage stamps and postal history of Sharjah

Telecommunications companies
 Du (telco)
 Etisalat
 Warid Telecom

Culture

 Abra (boat)
 Bukhoor
 Emblem of the United Arab Emirates
 Flag of the United Arab Emirates
 Mabkhara
 Tahiat Alalam
 Yowlah

Art

Languages
 Gulf Arabic
 English
 Urdu
 German
 Malayalam
 Hindi
 Tamil
Telugu

Music
 Music of the United Arab Emirates
 Sandwash

Economy of the United Arab Emirates
 Economy of the United Arab Emirates
 Abu Dhabi Investment Authority
 Abu Dhabi Securities Market
 Emiratisation
 Jebel Ali Free Zone
 My Vision - Challenges in the Race for Excellence
 The national sukuk program (UAE)
 United Arab Emirates dirham

Companies
 ADNOC
 Al-Ghurair Group
 Aldar Properties
 Ashai Group International
 Borouge
 Du (telco)
 Dubai Aerospace Enterprise
 Dubai International Capital
 Dubai Ports World
 Etisalat
 I-mate
 Warid Telecom

Public Relations companies
 Strawberry Public Relations
 The Guild

Web Development companies
 OnLime Middle East
 H2O Web Development Dubai
 Strategy Marketing Web Development Companies

Investment & Consulting companies
 ADS Securities
 ASCALA Capital and Consulting
 Emirates Investment & Development PSC (Dubai)

Media companies of the United Arab Emirates
 AMEInfo

Entertainment companies of the United Arab Emirates
 Lime Green Entertainments

Ports and harbours of the United Arab Emirates
 Hamriyah (Sharjah)
 Jebel Ali
 Port Rashid
 Mina' Zayid

Education in the United Arab Emirates

Schools in the United Arab Emirates
 Abu Dhabi Indian School
 American International School - Abu Dhabi
 American School of Dubai
 Dubai American Academy
 Dubai British School
 Dubai College
 Dubai Modern High School
 English College Dubai
 International School of Choueifat
 Our Own English High School
 Sharjah American International School
 St.Joseph's School
 Tamkeen
 Al Yasmina School
 Pearl Primary School
 Giggles English School
 Emirates National School
 Delhi Private School, Sharjah
 Delhi Private School, Dubai
 DPS Academy

Universities and colleges in the United Arab Emirates
 Abu Dhabi Men's College
 Abu Dhabi Women's College
 Ajman University of Science and Technology
 Al Ain Men's College
 Al Ain Women's College
 American University of Asia
 CERT Group of Companies
 American University in Dubai
 Dubai Medical College for Girls
 Dubai Men's College
 Dubai Women's College
 Etisalat University College
 Fujairah Men's College
 Fujairah Women's College
 Al Ghurair University
 Heriot-Watt University Dubai
 Higher Colleges of Technology
 Ittihad University
 Ras Al Khaimah Men's College
 Ras Al Khaimah Women's College
 American University of Sharjah
 Sharjah Men's College
 Sharjah Women's College
 Syscoms College
 The British University in Dubai
 United Arab Emirates University
 University of Wollongong in Dubai
 Zayed University

Emirates of the United Arab Emirates
 Emirates of the United Arab Emirates
 Abu Dhabi
 Ajmān
 Dubai
 Fujairah
 Ras al-Khaimah
 Sharjah
 Umm al-Quwain

Geography and geology of the United Arab Emirates

 Al Aweer
 Al Garhoud
 Al Hazzanah
 Al Isaily preserve
 Gulf of Oman
 ISO 3166-2:AE
 Nahwa
 Sharjah National Park

Demographics

Islands
 Al Lulu Island
 Dalma (island)
 Das Island
 Jumeirah Islands
 Muqayshit
 Marawah

Maps

Hills and mountains

 Western Hajar Mountains
 Jebel Buhais
 Jebel Faya
 Jebel Hafeet
 Ru'us al-Jibal
 Jebel Jais
 Jabal Yanas
 Jabal Yibir
 Shumayliyyah
 Jebel Al-Heben

Neighbourhoods
 Jumeirah
 Mirdif

Towns and villages
 Al Naba'ah
 Ar-Rams
 Dafta (United Arab Emirates)
 Dhadna
 Dhaid
 Dibba
 Jebel Ali
 Khalifa City
 Khatt
 Lehbab
 Masafi
 Wadi quda'ah

Geography stubs
 Abu Musa
 Ajmān
 Ajmān (city)
 Al Aweer
 Al Barsha Third
 Al Garhoud
 Al Hazzanah
 Al Isaily preserve
 Al-Jalila Field
 Al Khan
 Al Lulu Island
 Al Mushrif
 Al Naba'ah
 Al Reem Island
 Al Thaid
 Ar-Rams
 Bur Dubai
 Creative City
 Dafta (United Arab Emirates)
 Dalma (island)
 Das (island)
 Dhadna
 Dhaid
 Dibba
 Dubai Knowledge Village
 Dubai Marina
 Dubai Media City
 Educational Zone
 Emirates Road
 Gulf of Oman
 Hamriyah (Sharjah)
 Jebel Ali
 Jebel Ali Free Zone
 Jumeirah Islands
 Khatt
 Lehbab
 Marawah
 Masafi
 Port Rashid
 Mina' Zayid
 Muqayshit
 Mushrif Park
 Nahwa
 Naif
 Rigga Road
 Ruwais
 Saadiyat Island
 Satwa, Dubai
 Shams Abu Dhabi
 Sharjah National Park
 Sila (city)
 Suna pur
 Template:UAE-geo-stub
 Wadi quda'ah
 Zabeel Road

Government
 Dubai Police Force
 Federal National Council
 Military of the United Arab Emirates
 List of prime ministers of the United Arab Emirates

Foreign relations

 Greater and Lesser Tunbs

Health

Healthcare

History

 Gulf Air Flight 771
 Postage stamps and postal history of Sharjah
 Saqr bin Mohammad al-Qassimi

Elections
 United Arab Emirates parliamentary election, 2006

Law
 Human rights in the United Arab Emirates

Media
 Al Arabiya
 Aljazeera Publishing
 Dubai Media Incorporated
 Dubai One
 MBC 1
 MBC 2
 MBC 3
 MBC 4
 MBC FM
 Panorama FM
 The International Indian

Newspapers published here
 Al Bayan
 Al-Ittihad (newspaper)
 The Gulf Today
The Arabian Post (Dubai)

Organisations based here
 Dar al Ber Society
 Dubai Statistics Center
 Emaar Properties
 Middle East Public Relations Association
 MTME
 Nakheel Properties

People

 Ahmad Ali Al Sayegh
 Mohammad bin Ali Al Abbar
 Al Bu Muhair
 Ali Abdul Aziz Ali
 Dhiyab bin Isa
 Khalid bin Mohammed Al Qasimi
 Maktoum Hasher Maktoum Al Maktoum
 Mohammed Al Gergawi
 Mohammed Bin Zayed Al Nahyan
 Lubna al Qasimi
 Rashid III ibn Ahmad Al Mu'alla
 Reem Al Hashimi
 Saeed Al Ghaith
 Saud bin Saqr al Qasimi
 Shaikh Hamad bin Mohammed Al Sharqi
 Shakhbut bin Dhiyab
 Sheikh Humaid bin Rashid Al Nuaimi
 Sultan Bin Saqr Al Qasimi
 Tahnun bin Shakhbut
 Zayed bin Khalifa

Inventors
 Ali Al Naqbi
 Khalifa Al Rumaithi
 Mohammed Al Shamsi
 Reem Al Marzouqi

Emirati sportspeople
 Mohammed Al Qubaisi

Cricketers
 Imtiaz Abbasi
 Ali Asad Abbas
 Arshad Ali
 Asghar Ali
 Asim Saeed
 Mohammad Aslam (UAE cricketer)
 Abdurrahman Bukhathir
 Shaukat Dukanwala
 Fahad Usman
 Mohammad Fawad
 Mazhar Hussain
 Kashif Ahmed
 Khurram Khan
 Arshad Laeeq
 Rizwan Latif
 Mohammad Ishaq
 Ganesh Mylvaganam
 Naeemuddin
 Riaz Poonawala
 Ramveer Rai
 Saleem Raza (cricketer)
 Abdul Rehman (UAE cricketer)
 Azhar Saeed
 Saeed-Al-Saffar
 Johanne Samarasekera
 Sameer Zia
 Shehzad Altaf
 Sohail Butt
 Syed Maqsood
 Mohammad Tauqeer
 Vijay Mehra (UAE cricketer)
 Sultan Zarawani

ODI cricketers

 Imtiaz Abbasi
 Ali Asad Abbas
 Arshad Ali
 Asghar Ali
 Asim Saeed
 Mohammad Aslam (UAE cricketer)
 Shaukat Dukanwala
 Fahad Usman
 Mazhar Hussain
 Khurram Khan
 Arshad Laeeq
 Rizwan Latif
 Mohammad Ishaq
 Ganesh Mylvaganam
 Naeemuddin
 Riaz Poonawala
 Ramveer Rai
 Saleem Raza (cricketer)
 Abdul Rehman (UAE cricketer)
 Azhar Saeed
 Saeed-Al-Saffar
 Johanne Samarasekera
 Sameer Zia
 Shehzad Altaf
 Sohail Butt
 Syed Maqsood
 Mohammad Tauqeer
 Vijay Mehra (UAE cricketer)
 Sultan Zarawani

Bowlers
 Rizwan Latif
 Sameer Zia
 Syed Maqsood

Footballers
 Ali Al-Wehaibi
 Abdulrahman Ibrahim
 Ismail Matar
 Mohamed Omer (football player)
 Saif Mohammed
 Adnan Al Talyani

Rally drivers
 Mohammed Ben Sulayem

Sport shooters
 Ahmad Mohammad Hasher Al Maktoum

Racehorse owners & breeders
 Godolphin Stables
 Mohammed bin Rashid Al Maktoum
 Saeed bin Maktoum bin Rashid Al Maktoum

Artists
 Mehad Hamad
 Chokra
 Najat Makki

Businessmen
 Saif Ahmad Al Ghurair
 Sultan Ahmed bin Sulayem

Politicians

 Ahmad Al Tayer
 Ali bin Abdulla Al Kaabi
 Saeed Mohammad Al Gandi
 Khalifa bin Zayed Al Nahyan
 Maktoum bin Rashid Al Maktoum
 Mohammed bin Rashid Al Maktoum
 Rashid bin Saeed Al Maktoum
 Mansour bin Zayed Al Nahyan
 Mohammad bin Zayed Al Nahyan
 Nahyan bin Mubarak Al Nahyan
 Qasim Sultan Al Banna
 Lubna Khalid Al Qasimi
 Rashid ibn Abdullah Al Nuaimi
 Shakhbut Bin-Sultan Al Nahyan
 Abdullah bin Zayed Al Nahyan
 Sheikh Nahayan Mabarak Al Nahayan
 Sultan bin Zayed bin Sultan Al Nahyan
 Sultan bin Saeed Al Mansoori
 Zayed bin Sultan Al Nahyan
 Fayez Banihammad
 Marwan al-Shehhi

Writers
 See List of United Arab Emirati writers

Politics

 Federal National Council

Religion
 Islam in the United Arab Emirates
 Roman Catholicism in the United Arab Emirates

Science and technology
 Emirates Science club

Society
 Emirates Scout Association
 Girl Guides Association of the United Arab Emirates

Sport
 1996 AFC Asian Cup
 ADCC Submission Wrestling World Championship
 Australian rules football in the United Arab Emirates
 Godolphin Stables
 UAE Chess Federation
 United Arab Emirates cricket team

Football
 UAE League
 United Arab Emirates Football Association
 United Arab Emirates national football team

 Mohammed bin Rashid International Football Championship

Football clubs
 Al-Ahli (Dubai)
 Al Ain FC
 Dubai Club
 Al-Emarat
 Fujairah Club
 Al-Jazeera Club
 Al-Nasr Sports Club
 Al-Shaab (UAE)
 Al-Shabbab
 Sharjah FC
 Al-Wahda FC (Abu Dhabi)
 Al Wasl FC

Golf
 Abu Dhabi Golf Championship
 Dubai Desert Classic
 Dubai Ladies Masters
 DP World Tour Championship, Dubai

Olympics
 United Arab Emirates at the 1984 Summer Olympics
 United Arab Emirates at the 1988 Summer Olympics
 United Arab Emirates at the 1992 Summer Olympics
 United Arab Emirates at the 1996 Summer Olympics
 United Arab Emirates at the 2000 Summer Olympics
 United Arab Emirates at the 2004 Summer Olympics

Sport in Dubai
 Dubai 2016 Olympic bid
 Dubai Autodrome
 Dubai Fencing Club
 Dubai World Cup
 Team Dubai

Tourism

 Tourism in Dubai
 See also: Airports in the United Arab Emirates
 See also: Hotels in the United Arab Emirates

Airlines
 Abu Dhabi Aviation
 Aerovista Airlines
 Air Arabia
 Air Cess
 British Gulf International Airlines
 Cargo Plus Aviation
 Dolphin Air
 Emirates Airline
 Emirates SkyCargo
 Etihad Airways
 Falcon Aviation Services
 Falcon Express Cargo Airlines
 Kinshasa Airways
 Phoenix Aviation
 Pluto Airlines
 RAK Airways
 Royal Jet
 Fly Dubai
((Kenya Airways))

Visitor attractions

List of museums in the United Arab Emirates

Transportation

 Emirates Road
 Khor Fakkan

Aviation
 Dubai Airshow

Accidents and incidents
 Gulf Air Flight 771
 UPS Flight 6

Transport in Dubai
 Abra (boat)
 Dubai Metro
 Dubai Tram
 Port Rashid
 Rigga Road
 Sheikh Zayed Road
 Zabeel Road

Roads
 Sheikh Zayed Road
 Rigga Road
 Zabeel Road
 Emirates Road
 Baniyas Road
 Al Khaleej Road

Water transport

Stubs
 Template:UAE-stub
 21st Century Tower
 Abdul Rehman (UAE cricketer)
 Abu Dhabi Indian School
 Abu Dhabi Investment Authority
 Abu Dhabi Islands Archaeological Survey
 Abu Dhabi Men's College
 Abu Dhabi National Exhibitions Company
 Abu Dhabi TV
 Abu Dhabi Women's College
 Adnan Al Talyani
 Ahmad Al Tayer
 Ahmad Bin Majid
 Ahmed Bin Rashed Al-Maktoum
 Ajman University of Science and Technology
 Al Ain FC
 Al Ain Women's College
 Al Burj
 Al Emirate Club Stadium
 Al Garhoud bridge
 Al Jazira Mohammed Bin Zayed Stadium
 Al Wasl FC
 Al-Ahli (Dubai)
 Al-Emarat
 Al-Ittihad (newspaper)
 Al-Maktoum Stadium
 Al-Nahyan Stadium
 Al-Nasr Sports Club
 Al-Rashid Stadium
 Al-Wahda FC (Abu Dhabi)
 Aldar Properties
 Ali Asad Abbas
 Ali al Kaabi
 American University in Dubai
 Asghar Ali
 Ashai Group International
 Asim Saeed
 Burj Al Alam
 BurJuman
 Chelsea Tower
 Du (telco)
 Dubai Club
 Dubai College
 Dubai International Capital
 Dubai International Convention Centre
 Dubai Media Incorporated
 Dubai Medical College for Girls
 Dubai Men's College
 Dubai Modern High School
 Dubai Women's College
 Emblem of the United Arab Emirates
 Emirates Office Tower
 Emirates Palace
 English College Dubai
 Etisalat University College
 Fahad Usman
 Family tree of the Al Maktoum rulers
 Flag of the United Arab Emirates
 Fujairah Club
 Fujairah Men's College
 Fujairah Women's College
 Ganesh Mylvaganam
 Grand Mosque
 Gulf News
 Gulf Research Centre
 House of Poetry
 IPIC
 Ibn Battuta Mall
 Infinity Tower
 Ismail Matar
 Jeque Zayed Stadium
 Jumeirah Emirates Towers Hotel
 Jumeriah primary school
 Khaleej Times
 Khalid Bin Mohammed Stadium
 Khalid bin Mohammed Al Qasimi
 Khalifa bin Zayed Al Nahyan
 Lake Shore Towers
 Maktoum Hasher Maktoum Al Maktoum
 Maktoum bin Rashid Al Maktoum
 Mall of Arabia (Dubai)
 Mall of the Emirates
 Mansour bin Zayed Al Nahyan
 Mohammad Aslam (UAE cricketer)
 Mohammad Fawad
 Mohammad Tauqeer
 Mohammad bin Ali Al Abbar
 Mohammad bin Zayed Al Nahyan
 Mohammed Al Gergawi
 Mohammed Al Qubaisi
 Mohammed Ben Sulayem
 Mohammed Bin Zayed Al Nahyan
 Mohammed bin Khalifa Al-Maktoum
 Nakheel Properties
 Postage stamps and postal history of Sharjah
 Postage stamps of Abu Dhabi
 Ras Al Khaimah Men's College
 Ras Al Khaimah Women's College
 Rashid bin Saeed Al Maktoum
 Rizwan Latif
 Roman Catholicism in the United Arab Emirates
 Rose Rotana Suites
 Saeed Al Ghaith
 Saeed al gandi
 Sameer Zia
 Saud bin Saqr al Qasimi
 Al-Shaab (UAE)
 Shahraban Abdullah
 Sharjah American International School
 Sharjah FC
 Sharjah Men's College
 Sharjah Stadium (football)
 Sharjah Women's College
 Shaukat Dukanwala
 Shehab Ahmed
 Sheikh Humaid bin Rashid Al Nuaimi
 Sheikh Khalifa International Stadium
 Sheikh Nahayan Mabarak Al Nahayan
 Ski Dubai
 Sultan Bin Saqr Al Qasimi
 Sultan Zarawani
 Sultan bin Zayed bin Sultan Al Nahyan
 Syed Maqsood
 Tahnoun Bin Mohamed Stadium
 Tahnun bin Shakhbut
 The British School - Al Khubairat
 The Gulf Today
 The Marina Torch
 The Tower (Dubai)
 United Arab Emirates University
 United Arab Emirates at the 1984 Summer Olympics
 United Arab Emirates at the 1988 Summer Olympics
 United Arab Emirates at the 1992 Summer Olympics
 United Arab Emirates at the 1996 Summer Olympics
 United Arab Emirates at the 2000 Summer Olympics
 United Arab Emirates parliamentary election, 2006
 Vijay Mehra (UAE cricketer)
 Yowlah
 Zayed University

See also

 Lists of country-related topics - similar lists for other countries

References